Japan (pronounced   or  ) is an unincorporated community in southwest Franklin County, in the U.S. state of Missouri. The community is located on Missouri Route AE 7.5 mile west-northwest of Sullivan.

History
A post office called Japan was established in 1860, and remained in operation until 1908. The community was named after a local Roman Catholic Church, the Church of the Holy Martyrs of Japan. The name was almost changed in the aftermath of the attack on Pearl Harbor due to anti-Japanese sentiment in the United States.

References

Unincorporated communities in Franklin County, Missouri
Unincorporated communities in Missouri